Ilham Hussain (born May 23, 1955) is a Maldivian health advocate, public figure, and politician who served as the First Lady of the Maldives from 2012 until 2013 during the tenure of President Mohammed Waheed Hassan. She is the head of the Maldives Autism Association.

References

1955 births
Living people
First ladies of the Maldives
Gaumee Itthihaad politicians
People from Malé